Brett Clements (born 28 March 1973) is an Australian former professional rugby league footballer who played in the 1990s. He played for Canterbury-Bankstown in 1996 and the Newcastle Knights from 1997 to 1998.

Playing career
Clements made his first grade debut for Canterbury in 1996 after spending the previous 4 seasons in reserve grade.  In 1997, Clements joined Newcastle and made 13 appearances during the season including 2 finals matches but was not included in the premiership winning side that defeated Manly.  

Clements made 6 appearances the following year for the defending premiers and his last match in first grade was the elimination final loss against his former club Canterbury.

References

External links
http://www.rugbyleagueproject.org/players/Brett_Clements/summary.html

Australian rugby league players
Canterbury-Bankstown Bulldogs players
Newcastle Knights players
Living people
1973 births
Rugby league hookers
Rugby league players from Sydney